Luke Faust (born 1936) is an American folk musician. In the early 1960s he played a five-string banjo and sang Appalachian ballads, at The Gaslight Cafe in Greenwich Village, New York City.  For five or six years, Faust performed with Jerry Rasmussen.  One of his fellow entertainers at the Gaslight was Bob Dylan, who described Faust as "Someone closer in temperament to me."

Faust moved to Hoboken, New Jersey in 1963. In the early 1960s, he briefly played the jug performing with the Holy Modal Rounders. He would get on stage with a full gallon of red wine and unscrew the top, take a few chugs and start playing. His tone would get deeper as the gig went on.

In the late 1960s, Faust was a founding member of the band, The Insect Trust.  He was the band's banjo, fiddle and harmonica player. Later in the 1990s, he went on to form The Jug Jam, an improvisational jug band with Perry Robinson, Lou Grassi and Wayne Lopes. Faust also played with 90 proof – a band with Steve James.

Faust is currently performing with The Carolina Jug Stompers playing rags, blues and breakdowns in the old-time jug – stringband style. Faust's contributions to music has been described in Bob Dylan's book, Chronicles: Volume One, and Dave Van Ronk's compilation album, The Mayor of MacDougal Street.

Discography
With The Insect Trust
 1969 The Insect Trust
 1970 Hoboken Saturday Night 
With Dave Van Ronk
 2000 Dealin' With The Devil

With The Carolina Jug Stompers
 2005 Rooster on a Limb
. "Money Never Runs Out" 
. "Maybelle Rag" 
. "Going to Germany" 
. "Bum Bum Blues" 
. "New Orleans Wiggle"/"Somebody Stole My Gal" 
. "Gin Done Done It" 
. "Under the Chicken Tree" 
. "Lonely One in This Town" 
. "Cotton Picker’s Rag" 
. "Central Georgia Blues" 
. "Rooster on a Limb" 
. "Please Baby" 
. "Podunk Toddle" 
. "K.C. Moan" 
. "Georgia Pines" 
. "Busted"
. "Carolina Shout"/"House Rent Rag"

References

Bibliography
 La Gorce, Tammy.: "Throwing Rock Snobs a Bone",  The New York Times, December 18, 2005. Section 14NJ; Column 4; New Jersey Weekly Desk; Music; p. 14.
 "POP/JAZZ; STAMPFEL'S BOTTLE CAPS: A MERRY MIX OF MUSIC" by Robert Palmer. The New York Times, May 16, 1986, Late City Final Edition.

External links
The Insect Trust
The Carolina Jug Stompers

1936 births
Living people
American banjoists
Musicians from Hoboken, New Jersey
Musicians from New York City
American folk singers